Leiocithara costellarioides is a species of sea snail, a marine gastropod mollusk in the family Mangeliidae.

Description
The length of the shell attains 6 mm, its diameter 2.5 mm.

Distribution
This species occurs in shallow waters off Northern Zululand to East Transkei, South Africa

References

 Kilburn R.N. 1992. Turridae (Mollusca: Gastropoda) of southern Africa and Mozambique. Part 6. Subfamily Mangeliinae, section 1. Annals of the Natal Museum, 33: 461–575

External links
  Tucker, J.K. 2004 Catalog of recent and fossil turrids (Mollusca: Gastropoda). Zootaxa 682:1–1295.

Endemic fauna of South Africa
costellarioides
Gastropods described in 1992